The 2019–20 Tennessee Lady Volunteers basketball team represents the University of Tennessee in the 2019–20 college basketball season. Led by former Lady Vol Kellie Harper, entering her first year as head coach, the team play their games at Thompson–Boling Arena and are members of the Southeastern Conference.

In the December 12 win against Colorado State, junior Rennia Davis scored her 1,000th career point. She finished the night with 1,007, and the 45th Lady Vol to surpass the mark.

The Lady Vols ended the regular season and received a first-round bye in the SEC tournament, defeated Missouri in the second round, but lost to Kentucky in the quarterfinals.

Previous season
The 2018–19 team finished the season 19–13, 7–9 for a seventh-place tie in SEC play. They lost in the quarterfinals of the SEC tournament to Mississippi State. They received an at-large bid to the NCAA tournament where they lost to UCLA in the first round. At the completion of the season, Holly Warlick was fired as head coach. Harper, who was a point guard during Tennessee's three-peat from 1996 to 1998, was hired as her replacement on April 8, 2019.

Preseason

SEC media poll
The SEC media poll was released on October 15, 2019, with Tennessee predicted to finish sixth.

Preseason All-SEC team
The Lady Vols had one player selected to the preseason all-SEC team, junior guard-forward Rennia Davis, who was selected for second team.

Roster

Rankings

^Coaches' Poll did not release a second poll at the same time as the AP.

Schedule

|-
!colspan=9 style=""| Exhibition

|-
!colspan=9 style=""| Regular season

|-
!colspan=9 style=""| SEC tournament

References

Tennessee
Tennessee Lady Volunteers basketball seasons
Volunteers
Volunteers